Trichomonascaceae is a family of fungi in the order Saccharomycetales. According to the 2007 Outline of Ascomycota, the family contains 5 genera.

References

Saccharomycetes